Cyprus Popular Bank (from 2006 to 2011 known as Marfin Popular Bank) was the second-largest banking group in Cyprus behind the Bank of Cyprus until it was 'shuttered' in March 2013 and split into two parts. The 'good' Cypriot part was merged into the Bank of Cyprus (including insured deposits under 100,000 Euro) and the 'bad' part or legacy entity holds all the overseas operations as well as uninsured deposits above 100,000 Euro, old shares and bonds. The uninsured depositors were subject to a bail-in and became the new shareholders of the legacy entity.  As at May 2017, the legacy entity is one of the largest shareholders of Bank of Cyprus with 4.8% but does not hold a board seat. All the overseas operations, of the now defunct Cyprus Popular Bank, are also held by the legacy entity, until they are sold by the Special Administrator, at first Ms Andri Antoniadou, who ran the legacy entity for two years, from March 2013 until 3 March 2015. She tendered her resignation due to disagreements, with the Governor of the Central Bank of Cyprus and the Central Bank Board members, who amended the lawyers of the legacy entity, without consulting her. Veteran banker Chris Pavlou who is an expert in Treasury and risk management took over as Special Administrator of the legacy entity in April 2015 until December 2016. The legacy entity is pursuing legal action against former major shareholder Marfin Investment Group.

Its shares were listed on the Cyprus Stock Exchange and the Athens Stock Exchange. CPB had a network of more than 295 branches in Cyprus, Russia, Ukraine, Romania, Serbia, the UK and Malta. The bank had applied to open a representative office in Beijing, People's Republic of China.

Trading on the island as Laiki Bank (Laiki being the Greek word for Popular), as of September 2012 it held a 16% share of the market in loans and a 14.4% share of deposits.  The Bank made a series of large loans, many to Greek companies prior to and during their financial crisis. What followed has been described as "billions handed out in bad loans created a financial time-bomb". After the bank collapsed, it was rescued by the Cypriot government, which took 84% ownership on 30 June 2012 and  it is being dismantled as part of the 2012–2013 Cypriot financial crisis.

History
In 1901, four leading citizens of Limassol—Agathoclis Francoudis, Ioannis Kyriakides, Christodoulos Sozos and Neoklis Ioannides—established the Popular Savings Bank of Limassol to encourage saving among the workforce. More than two decades later, in 1924, the bank changed its name from the Popular Savings Bank of Limassol to the Popular Bank of Limassol. The bank also became the first company in Cyprus to register as a public-traded company.

Then in 1967, the Popular Bank of Limassol changed its name to Cyprus Popular Bank (CPB) to reflect the bank’s expansion beyond Limassol. Expansion beyond Limassol followed quickly, with the establishment of its first branches in Nicosia,  Famagusta (1969), and Paphos and Larnaca (1970). Also in 1970, Midland Bank acquired 22% of the company's shares, making Midland a major shareholder in CPB. The next year CPB relocated its headquarters from Limassol to Nicosia.

1974 CPB established its first London branch. 
1983 CPB acquired all the Cyprus operations of Grindlays Bank located in the area under government control. 
1992 CPB opened the first branch of European Popular Bank in Athens. CPB owned 58% of the shares of the bank; other shareholders included HSBC (formerly Midland Bank) and Greek and Cypriot investors. CPB retained branches in Heraklion and Thessaloniki
1995 CPB opened its first representative offices in South Africa and in Toronto, Ontario, Canada.
1996 CPB opened its first representative offices in Australia. 
1997 CPB opened its first representative offices in Serbia and in Russia ("Rosprombank") 
1998 CPB establishes a representative office in New York. (NY State Banking Dept says State chartered).
2000 The Cyprus Popular Bank Group changed its name to Laiki Group.
2001 The Laiki Group established a subsidiary in Australia with five branches. 
2005 The Group established Laiki Bank (Guernsey), and purchased Bank Centrobank in Serbia. 
2006 The Greek Marfin Investment Group acquired HSBC's shares in Laiki Bank, establishing a strong minority share position.  Subsequently, the Marfin Investment Group through more acquisitions managed to take control of Laiki Bank, which it re-branded as Marfin Popular Bank.  In Greece, the Marfin Group consolidated Egnatia, Laiki and Marfin to form Marfin Egnatia Bank, which is the 95%-owned Greek subsidiary of Marfin Popular Bank.
2007 The bank announced the planned takeover of 50.12% of the share capital of AS SBM Pank, a bank in Estonia. 
MPB also acquired 99.2% of the shares of Marine Transport Bank Ukraine for US$156 million. This bank was founded in 1993 as Marine Trade Bank and changed its name to Marine Transport Bank in 1996. It has its headquarters in the Odessa region and has 86 branches. 
Lastly, MPB acquired 43% of the share capital of Lombard Bank Malta for €48 million from Banca della Svizzera Italiana (BSI) of Lugano. CPB now holds c. 49% of Lombard Bank Malta.
 In 2007, the bank announced a multi-million financial deal to sponsor the football First Division in Cyprus until 2010.
2008 Marfin Popular Bank completed its acquisition of 50.4% of the shares of CJSC RPB Holding, parent company of the Rossisysky Promishlenny Bank (Rosprombank), for €83 million. The acquisition makes Marfin the first Greek or Cypriot bank to acquire control of a bank in Russia.
 In 2010, they launched a new mobile banking and mobile trading service. In the same year, the company was selected as the bank of the year in Cyprus by the Banker.
2010 MPB sold 85% of Laiki Bank Australia to Bank of Beirut. The Australian bank received a new name, Beirut Hellenic Bank. At the time, the bank had a branch in Adelaide, four branches in Melbourne and five branches in Sydney. 
2011 MPB sold the majority of its shareholding in its Estonian subsidiary and returned to its historic name of Cyprus Popular Bank (CPB).
In 2012 CPB converted its Greek subsidiary into a branch of the parent bank.

The 2012–2013 Cypriot financial crisis resulted in financial difficulties at CPB. The Cypriot state recapitalized CPB on 30 June 2012 with the result that the government acquired 84% of the bank's equity. This increased the bank's core tier 1 capital ratio towards 9%, the level mandated by the European Banking Authority.
In early 2013 CPB renamed its Greek branches to CPB Bank and on 26 March the bank sold them to Piraeus Bank. Laiki was split into a good and bad bank, the good bank (Cyprus operations) merged with Bank of Cyprus and the bad bank is in the process of being sold and finally shuttered. The board and CEO were replaced on 27 March. The bad bank was being run by a Special Administrator Ms Andri Antoniadou who was acting CEO until 3 March 2015. Veteran banker Chris Pavlou took over as Special Administrator in April 2015 until December 2016.

In 2018 European Court dismisses compensation claim in Cyprus 2013 deposit-grab.

References

External links

 Official website 

Defunct banks of Cyprus
Banks established in 1901
Banks disestablished in 2013
Companies based in Nicosia
1901 establishments in Cyprus
2013 disestablishments in Cyprus